Ulkosaaret is a subdistrict of Helsinki, Finland.

External links 
 

Neighbourhoods of Helsinki